Occupation of Iran or Iran occupation may refer to:
Battle of the Persian Gate
Battle of Gaugamela
Muslim conquest of Persia
Mongol invasion of Khwarezmia and Eastern Iran
Persian campaign (World War I)
Anglo-Soviet invasion of Iran